Charkhari State was one of the Princely states of India during the period of the British Raj. On India's independence, this Princely state acceded to India. Currently Charkhari town, the former state's capital, is a part of Uttar Pradesh state.

History
Charkhari State was founded in 1765 by Khuman Singh.

In 1857 Raja Ratan Singh received a hereditary salute of 11 guns, a khilat and a perpetual jagir of £1300 a year in recognition of his services during the Indian Mutiny.

The last ruler of this Princely state signed the accession to the Indian Union on 15 August 1947.

Rulers
In 1804, under Raja Bikramajit Singh (1782–1829) rule, the state became a British protectorate.

Rajas
       1765 –        1782  Khuman Singh                       (b. ... – d. 1782)
       1782 –    Nov 1829  Bikramajit Singh                   (b. ... – d. 1829)
       1829 –        1860  Ratan Singh
       1860 –        1880  Jai Singh Deo                      (b. ... – d. 1880)

Maharajas
       1880 –  6 July 1908  Malkhan Singh                      (b. 1872 – d. 1908)
 6 July 1908 –        1914  Jujhar Singh
       1914 –  5 October 1920  Ganga Singh
       1920 –  8 November 1941  Arimardan Singh                    (b. 1903 – d. 1941)
 8 November 1941 – 15 August 1947 Jayendra Singh                     (b. ... – d. 1977)

Titular Maharaja
 1947 – 1977 Jayendra Singh
 1977 – present Jayant Singh

See also
Bundelkhand Agency
Political integration of India

References

Mahoba district
Bundelkhand
Princely states of Bundelkhand
1765 establishments in India
1947 disestablishments in India
Rajputs
Princely states of Uttar Pradesh